Valenzuela's 1st congressional district is one of the two congressional districts of the Philippines in the city of Valenzuela. It has been represented in the House of Representatives of the Philippines since 2001. The district was created following Valenzuela's conversion into a highly-urbanized city through Republic Act No. 8526 on February 14, 1998. It consists of 24 barangays in the northern part of the city, namely Arkong Bato, Balangkas, Bignay, Bisig, Canumay East, Canumay West, Coloong, Dalandanan, Isla, Lawang Bato, Lingunan, Mabolo, Malanday, Malinta, Palasan, Pariancillo Villa, Pasolo, Poblacion, Polo, Punturin, Rincon, Tagalag, Veinte Reales and Wawang Pulo. It is currently vacant for the 19th Congress since its most recent representative Rex Gatchalian assumed the position of Secretary of Social Welfare and Development.

Representation history

Election results

2022
Incumbent representative is Weslie Gatchalian.

2019
Incumbent representative is Weslie Gatchalian.

2016
Incumbent is Win Gatchalian.

2013
Incumbent is Win Gatchalian.

2010
Incumbent is Rex Gatchalian.

2007
Incumbent is Bobbit Carlos.

See also
Legislative districts of Valenzuela

References

Congressional districts of the Philippines
Politics of Valenzuela, Metro Manila
1998 establishments in the Philippines
Congressional districts of Metro Manila
Constituencies established in 1998